The 2022 North American Formula 1000 Championship presented by EPC is the sixth season of the North American Formula 1000 Championship. The sixteen round season begins on April 1 at Carolina Motorsports Park, and ends on October 16 at Pittsburgh International Race Complex.

Last year's champion, Alex Mayer, became a five-time champion in the series. Mayer has won every season since the series' launch. Mayer did not contest the championship this year. The championship was won by Nathan Byrd.

Drivers and teams

Schedule

Driver standings

See also
North American Formula 1000 Championship

References

North American Formula